Brynley William Allen (23 March 1921 – 21 July 2005) was a Welsh professional footballer who played as an inside forward for various clubs in the 1940s and 1950s and made two appearances for Wales.

Football career
Allen was born in Gilfach Goch, Glamorgan and as a schoolboy attracted the attention of several football League clubs, including Manchester United, where he had an unsuccessful trial. On leaving school, he was employed in the Trave Colliery before signing for Swansea Town when he was 16. He had not broken into Swansea's first team before his career was interrupted by the Second World War.

During the war, he joined the Royal Navy where he served on board the battleship  on convoy duty.

He guested or Cardiff City during the hostilities and, after he was demobilised at the end of the war, he was signed by the club on a permanent basis in December 1945. Described as a "clever and skillful player with an excellent body swerve", he made his professional debut on the opening day of the 1946–47 season during a 2–1 defeat to Norwich City. Allen soon became a regular with Cardiff and his 18 goals helped them to promotion at the end of the first post-war Football League campaign. Allen, however, did not remain long in the Second Division and was transferred to Newport County in October 1947.

He returned to Ninian Park in August 1948, with Reg Parker moving in the opposite direction, but in May 1949 he was transferred to Reading. Nine months later, he was back in the Second Division with Coventry City. In January 1950, Reading had played an evening match against Coventry City; after the match, Reading's manager Ted Drake mentioned to Harry Storer that Allen was available for transfer. Storer then set off immediately to Allen's home, where he persuaded him to sign, with the deal being completed at midnight.

Allen's international debut came on 21 October 1950, when he was called up for the Home Championship match against Scotland. Despite displaying great "cohesion" and making good use of the ball "as a line", Wales lost 3–1 to the more muscular Scots. Allen retained his place for the next match against England the following month; this match also ended in a defeat for Wales.

Allen remained with Coventry until 1952, when he dropped down to non-league football with Merthyr Tydfil, before spells at Hereford United, Barry Town and Haverfordwest Athletic. At Barry Town, he was part of the team which won the Welsh Cup in 1955, defeating Chester 4–3 in the final, after a replay.

International appearances
Roberts made two appearances for Wales in official international matches, as follows:

Later career
After leaving professional football, Allen worked as a postman in his home town of Gilfach Goch, where he died on 21 July 2005. He was buried at Tonyrefail Cemetery.

In May 2007, Allen's collection of sporting memorabilia came up for auction. The lots included his Football League Division Three (South) Championship medal from 1946 to 1947 (sold for £1,100), his international jerseys from the matches against Scotland and England in 1950 (sold for £600 each) and a scrapbook of ephemera.

Honours
Cardiff City
Third Division South champions: 1946–47

Barry Town
Welsh Cup winners: 1955

References

External links

1921 births
People from Glamorgan
2005 deaths
Welsh footballers
Association football forwards
Wales international footballers
Swansea City A.F.C. players
Cardiff City F.C. players
Newport County A.F.C. players
Reading F.C. players
Coventry City F.C. players
Merthyr Tydfil F.C. players
Hereford United F.C. players
Barry Town United F.C. players
Haverfordwest County A.F.C. players
English Football League players
Southern Football League players
Royal Navy personnel of World War II